Lutidine is the trivial name used to describe the chemical compounds which are dimethyl derivatives of pyridine. Their chemical properties resemble those of pyridine, although the presence of the methyl groups may prohibit some of the more straightforward reactions. Lutidine comes in several isomers:

2,3-Lutidine (2,3-dimethylpyridine)
2,4-Lutidine (2,4-dimethylpyridine)
2,5-Lutidine (2,5-dimethylpyridine)
2,6-Lutidine (2,6-dimethylpyridine)
3,4-Lutidine (3,4-dimethylpyridine)
3,5-Lutidine (3,5-dimethylpyridine)

All isomers share the molecular weight 107,16 g/mol and the chemical formula C7H9N.

Pyridines
Amines
Amine solvents